Juan Sebastián Cabal and Robert Farah were the defending champions but Farah chose not to participate this year. Cabal played alongside Denys Molchanov, but lost in the semifinals to Max Mirnyi and Philipp Oswald.

Mirnyi and Oswald went on to win the title, defeating Damir Džumhur and Antonio Šančić in the final, 6–3, 7–5.

Seeds

Draw

Draw

References
 Main Draw

Kremlin Cup - Men's Doubles
2017 Doubles